Bob and Mike Bryan were the defending champions, but lost in second round to Jonathan Erlich and Andy Ram.

Mark Knowles and Daniel Nestor won the title, defeating Jonas Björkman and Todd Woodbridge 6–2, 3–6, 6–3 in the final.

Seeds
All seeds received a bye into the second round.

Draw

Finals

Top half

Bottom half

External links
 Main Draw (ATP)

Doubles